Windeck is an Angolan television telenovela produced by Semba Comunicação and broadcast in Angola on RTP1 , between April 8, 2013 and December 31, 2013, with a repeat of the last episode on January 2, 2014. The telenovela was nominated in 2013 for the International Emmy Awards for Best Telenovela with Avenida Brasil and Side by side, both from Rede Globo , and with 30 Vies , from Canada.

Cast
Tânia Burity
Micaela Reis
Raul Cachombo
Fredy Costa
Celso Roberto
Nádia Silva
Edusa Chindecasse
Vanda Pedro
Yolanda Viegas
Enoque Caraco
Helena Moreno

References

External links

2012 telenovelas
2012 television series debuts
2013 television series endings
Angolan telenovelas
Televisão Pública de Angola original programming
2010s Angolan television series
Portuguese-language telenovelas